Downtown Records is an American record label based in New York City with offices in Los Angeles. Owned and operated by Josh Deutsch and Terence Lam, the label is distributed by Geffen Records (formerly Interscope Records and The Orchard) in the US and in the UK distributed by Polydor Records.

The roster includes artists such as Nick Murphy, Brett Dennen, Electric Guest, Tei Shi, Goldroom and Tommy Genesis.

History
The label was co-founded by Josh Deutsch and Terence Lam in 2006 and grew to become Downtown Music with publishing, licensing, music services and Songtrust. In 2013 Downtown Records was purchased outright by its original co-founders and now operates fully independent. The label's music was distributed by Sony Music's RED Distribution and Cooperative Music. It is now distributed by Interscope Records/Universal Music Group (now Geffen Records).

In addition to the sister label, Mercer Street Records, Downtown has label partnerships with Dim Mak Records, Fool's Gold Records and Mad Decent.

Downtown Records also operates Downtown Events – a festival and concert promotion company that produces The Downtown Music Festival.

Roster

 The Academic
 Ant Beale
 Autre Ne Veut
 Big Time Rush
 Bop English
 Brett Dennen
 Dawn Golden
 Devin Di Dakta
 Electric Guest
 Ex Cops
 Goldroom
 Houses
 Lawrence Rothman
 Lola Kirke
 Lorde Fredd33
 Mapei
 Miike Snow
 Neon Trees
 Nick Murphy (aka Chet Faker)
 Sammi Sanchez
 San Fermin
 Santigold
 Slow Magic
 Smino
 Tei Shi
 Tkay Maidza
 Tommy Genesis
 Vacationer

Past roster

 Andrew Wyatt
 Amanda Blank
 Art Brut
 Butter the Children
 Carla Bruni
 Chloē Laing
 Cold War Kids
 The Cranberries
 Crookers
 Cyndi Lauper
 Die Antwoord
 The Drums
 Duck Sauce
 Duke Dumont
 Eagles of Death Metal
 Gnarls Barkley
 Jonathan Wilson
 Justice
 Kid Sister
 Kate Earl
 Katie Herzig
 Lissy Trullie
 Major Lazer
 Marilyn Manson
 Mura Masa
 Mas Ysa
 Mos Def
 MSTRKRFT
 Penguin Prison
 Port St. Willow
 Say Lou Lou
 Scissor Sisters
 SomeKindaWonderful
 Spank Rock
 Wildcat! Wildcat! 
 William Fitzsimmons
 White Denim
 YACHT

Mercer Street Records:
 Aṣa 
 David Gray
 Femi Kuti 
 Jessie Harris
 Kitty, Daisy & Lewis 
 Meshell Ndegeocello 
 Ozomatli 
 William Fitzsimmons

References

External links

The Changing Role Of A&R, Billboard
Interview with Josh Deutsch, HitQuarters Sep 06

American independent record labels
Record labels established in 2006
Alternative rock record labels
Rock record labels
Pop record labels